The 15th Army was a field army of the Soviet Red Army during the Second World War.

The 15th Army, as part of the 8th Army, took part in the Winter War from February 12 to March 13.

Reformed at Birobidzhan, Soviet Union, from the 2nd Red Banner Army in June 1940.  It formed in July 1940 as part of the Far Eastern Front. Until August 1945 the army defended the Far Eastern borders of the USSR. On August 5 it was incorporated into the newly created 2nd Far Eastern Front. On August 9, during the Soviet–Japanese War, the 15th Army, consisting of shock troops, participated in the Sungari operation. Its advance units entered Harbin on August 20. Through the end of August the 15th Army destroyed the scattered pieces of the Japanese Kwantung Army. Conducted border operations through mid-1945.  Participated in the Soviet invasion of Manchuria and the crossing of the Amur River in August 1945.

Composition April 1943
34th Rifle Division
39th Rifle Division
Novoye Fortified Area
203rd Tank Brigade

Composition August 1945
34th Rifle Division
361st Rifle Division
388th Rifle Division
171st Tank Brigade

In October 1953, by the order of the Minister of Defense of the USSR dated 23 April 1953, the staff of the Far East Military District, the former 2nd Far-Eastern Front, was reorganised as the staff of the 15th Army, with its headquarters at Yuzhno-Sakhalinsk.

In May 1957, rifle divisions were reformed into motor rifle divisions. On 17 May 1957, the 56th Rifle Division became the 56th Motor Rifle Division (in this case the 357th Rifle Regiment was renamed as the 390th Rifle Regiment); The 41st Rifle Red Banner Division was renamed the 41st Motor-Rifle Red Banner Division. The 79th Rifle Sakhalin Division was renamed the 79th Motor-Rifle Sakhalin Division. All three newly renamed divisions formed part of the 15th Army.

On 1 April 1958 the 41st Red Banner Motor Rifle Division was disbanded.

In 1960 the army headquarters was moved to Khabarovsk on the mainland and assigned a new division, the 129th Motor Rifle Division at Khabarovsk. After briefly being renamed the 18th Army in 1967-69 it was renamed back to the 15th Army and assigned several new divisions, the 73rd Motor Rifle Division arriving from the North Caucasus Military District in mid 1968, two fortified areas being assigned (the 2nd and 17th), the 270th Motor Rifle Division being formed in 1970, and the 81st Guards and 135th Motor Rifle Divisions being transferred from the disbanding 45th Army Corps in November 1972.

In October 1993 the 15th Army was renamed the 43rd Army Corps.

Commanders 
 Mikhail Kovalyov (12.02.1940 — 25.02.1940)
 Vladimir Kurdyumov (25.02.1940 — 28.03.1940)
 Leonty Cheremisov (07.1940 - 11.1941) 
 Michael Savushkin (11.1941 - 10.1942)
 Stepan Mamonov (10.1942 - 08.1945)
 Nikolay Krylov (04.1953 - 09.1953)
 Semyon Kozak (09.1953 - 12.1953)
 Nikolai Trufanov (01.1954 - 01.1956)

References

External links
Leo Niehorster, - Order of battle 22 June 1941

015
Military units and formations established in 1940
Military units and formations of the Soviet Union in the Winter War